Kibalchich may refer to:
Nikolai Kibalchich (1850–1881), a Russian/Ukrainian scientist, revolutionary, terrorist, pioneer of rocketry. The International Astronomical Union honoured the rocketry pioneer by naming a crater on the moon Kibal'chich.
Victor Kibalchich (1890–1947), better known as Victor Serge, a Russian anarchist and communist
Vlady Kibalchich Rusakov (1920 – 2005), Russian-Mexican painter

See also
Kibal'chich (crater),  named after Nikolai Kibalchich
Malchish-Kibalchish